Weld El 15, real name Ala Edine Yacoubi, is a Tunisian rapper. Ala is born in 1988 in Tunis. At the age of 15, he started to write his first texts under the pseudonym "Weld El 15".

Controversies
In June 2013 he was given a two-year prison sentence for insulting the police with his song 'Boulicia Kleb' (Cops are Dogs).
In September 2014 he was nominated by European United Left–Nordic Green Left for the Sakharov Prize, along with the Moroccan rapper L7a9d and the Egyptian blogger Alaa Abd El-Fattah. The following month, the nomination was withdrawn after controversy over some 2012 tweets by Abd El-Fattah at the time of Israel's bombing of Gaza.

In May 2018, Weld was expelled from France for misbehaving and having drugs at home. He was kept on parole followed by expulsion on May 31.

Discography 

 Boulicia Kleb (2012)
 Khalli Elberah Wrak (2018)
 Boy (2019)
 Vampire (2019)
 Snitch (2019)
 G.G.5ra (2019)
 Maria (2019)
 Very Nice (2020)
 Fi Houmti 2020
 Salamet ft A.L.A (2020)
Pyramide (2020)
Balawi (2021)
Beha N3ich - بيها نعيش .ft Si Lemhaf (2021)
King West (2021)

Movies 

 Tunisia Clash (2015)
 Eclipses (2016)
Road to El Kef (2021)
Cali Serie (2021)

References

External links
Boulicia Kleb
Weld El 15 Signed to El Distro Network
Turns Out Fake News Is Mostly A Boost For African Entertainers

Tunisian musicians
Tunisian rappers
Tunisian democracy activists
Year of birth missing (living people)
Living people